The Safeguarding Vulnerable Groups Act 2006 (c 47) is an Act of the Parliament of the United Kingdom. It was created following the UK Government accepting recommendation 19 of the inquiry headed by Sir Michael Bichard, which was set up in the wake of the Soham Murders.

The Act established the legal basis for the Independent Safeguarding Authority who managed the two lists of people barred from working with children and/or vulnerable adults replacing the former barred lists (List 99, the Protection of Children Act 1999 (PoCA), the scheme relating to the Protection of Vulnerable Adults (PoVA) and Disqualification Orders). The Act also places a statutory duty on all those working with vulnerable groups to register and undergo an advanced vetting process with criminal sanctions for non-compliance.

Section 65 - Commencement
The following orders were made under this section:
The Safeguarding Vulnerable Groups Act 2006 (Commencement No. 1) Order 2007 (S.I. 2007/3545 (C.153))
The Safeguarding Vulnerable Groups Act 2006 (Commencement No. 2) Order 2008 (S.I. 2008/1320 (C.57))
The Safeguarding Vulnerable Groups Act 2006 (Commencement No. 3) Order 2009 (S.I. 2009/39 (C.3))
The Safeguarding Vulnerable Groups Act 2006 (Commencement No. 4) Order 2009 (S.I. 2009/1503 (C.76))
The Safeguarding Vulnerable Groups Act 2006 (Regulated Activity, Miscellaneous and Transitional Provisions and Commencement No. 5) Order 2009 (S.I. 2009/2610 (C.114))
The Safeguarding Vulnerable Groups Act 2006 (Commencement No. 6, Transitional Provisions and Savings) Order 2009 (S.I. 2009/2611 (C.115))
The Safeguarding Vulnerable Groups Act 2006 (Commencement No. 6, Transitional Provisions and Savings (Amendment)) and (Commencement No. 7) Order 2010 (S.I. 2010/1101 (C.72))
The Safeguarding Vulnerable Groups Act 2006 (Commencement No. 1) (England) Order 2008 (S.I. 2008/3204 (C.145))
The Safeguarding Vulnerable Groups Act 2006 (Commencement No. 1) (Northern Ireland) Order 2008 (S.I. 2008/930 (C.45))

References

External links
Bichard Report
Every Child Matters
Welsh Assembly Government Vetting and Barring webpage 
Explanatory notes to the Safeguarding Vulnerable Groups Act 2006.

United Kingdom Acts of Parliament 2006
2006 in British law
Acts of the Parliament of the United Kingdom concerning England and Wales
Acts of the Parliament of the United Kingdom concerning Northern Ireland
Vulnerable adults